Marcelo Esteban Olivera (born 4 January 1999) is an Argentine footballer who plays as a forward for Sportivo Las Parejas, on loan from Estudiantes de Río Cuarto.

Club career

Early life and Quilmes
Olivera started playing football at Unión Cultural y Deportivo Eldorado de Misiones until Ricardo Kergavarat saw him play and took him to Buenos Aires to try him out at Quilmes. He stayed and since then he played in the different youth categories of the club, which he arrived in 2014 when he was 15 years old and immediately adapted, scoring a lot of goals for the different youth teams. 15-year old Olivera was soon promoted to the clubs reserve team, where he made his debut against Club de Gimnasia y Esgrima La Plata and in October 2016, 17-year old Olivera started training with the professional team. He was also awarded to prizes by the end of the year by Argentine Football Association.

He played kept scoring goals for the reserves until on 21 June 2017 where he, without a professional contract, made his debut in the Argentine Primera División against Arsenal de Sarandí (2-2). He started on the bench, but replaced Gabriel Ramírez in the 78th minute. However, this was his first and last professional game for the club.

Universidad San Martín
In January 2019, Olivera appeared in training sessions at Universidad San Martín in Peru, having turned 20 years old and without having signed a contract with Quilmes, at least for the moment, according to the decision of the directive. The legislation says, that when a player turns 20 years old and the club haven't signed with him or the player refuses to sign his first contract, the player can go to a club in a different country from the club of origin as a free player.

Olivera did not return to Quilmes training on 3 January 2019 because he did't have a contract, and on 4 January 2019, he turned 20 and began training with Universidad San Martín. Quilmes, through the Argentine Football Association, immediately attempted a protest of the case. Eventually, Olivera made the preseason with San Martín, scoring goals in friendlies and signing a contract as a free player on 10 February 2019.

On 16 February 2019, he made his official debut for the club in a 1-1 draw against UTC Cajamarca, where he also scored his first goal in Peru and at a professional level. Although he began to enjoy a lot of regularity, an injury in June took him away from the courts throughout the 2019 season, returning to play in February 2020 again, after more than 7 months out of action. He left the club at the end of 2020.

Estudiantes
In June 2021, Olivera returned to Argentina and joined Estudiantes de Río Cuarto. A year later, in June 2022, Olivera was loaned out to Sportivo Las Parejas until the end of the year.

References

External links
 

Living people
1999 births
Association football forwards
Argentine footballers
Argentine expatriate footballers
Argentine Primera División players
Peruvian Primera División players
Primera Nacional players
Quilmes Atlético Club footballers
Club Deportivo Universidad de San Martín de Porres players
Estudiantes de Río Cuarto footballers
Sportivo Las Parejas footballers
Argentine expatriate sportspeople in Peru
Expatriate footballers in Peru
Sportspeople from Misiones Province